Heerkes is a surname, likely of Dutch origin. Notable people with the surname include:
 Gert Heerkes (born 1965), Dutch football manager
 Menno Heerkes (born 1993), Dutch footballer